Elkhart Township is one of sixteen townships in Elkhart County, Indiana. As of the 2010 census, its population was 36,487.

History
The Dierdorff Farmstead was listed on the National Register of Historic Places in 2011.

Geography

Cities and towns
 Goshen (vast majority)

Unincorporated towns
 Waterford Mills

Adjacent townships
 Jefferson Township (north)
 Middlebury Township (northeast)
 Clinton Township (east)
 Benton Township (southeast)
 Jackson Township (south)
 Union Township (southwest)
 Harrison Township (west)
 Concord Township (northwest)

Major highways

Cemeteries
The township contains seven cemeteries: Cripe, Elkhart Prairie, Hess, Oak Ridge, Sparklin, Studebaker and Violett.

Education
Elkhart Township residents may obtain a library card at the Goshen Public Library in Goshen.

References
 
 United States Census Bureau cartographic boundary files

External links
 Indiana Township Association
 United Township Association of Indiana

Townships in Elkhart County, Indiana
Townships in Indiana